The Zollino–Gallipoli railway is an Italian  long railway line that connects Lecce and Zollino with Gallipoli in the region called Apulia.

History

The line was opened in stages between 1884 and 1885.

Usage
The line is used by the following service(s):

Local services (Treno regionale) Lecce - Zollino - Nardo - Gallipoli

See also 
 List of railway lines in Italy

References

This article is based upon a translation of the Italian language version as at February 2015.

External links 

Railway lines in Apulia
Railway lines opened in 1884